"Forever" is a song by English band Strawbs written by Dave Cousins and Tony Hooper. It did not feature on any of their studio albums at the time but was included as a bonus track on the CD re-release of the albums Just a Collection of Antiques and Curios and Dragonfly.

B-Side

The B-side track "Another Day" is taken from the Dragonfly album. The Italian release was paired with "Fingertips", a song from Just a Collection of Antiques and Curios''.

Personnel

Dave Cousins –  lead vocals, acoustic guitar
Tony Hooper – backing vocals, acoustic guitar, percussion
Ron Chesterman – double bass
Rick Wakeman – organ
Claire Deniz – cello
Bjarne Rostvold – drums
Tony Visconti – production
Roger Quested – engineer

Release history

External links
Lyrics to "Forever" at Strawbsweb
Lyrics to "Another Day" at Strawbsweb
Lyrics to "Fingertips" at Strawbsweb

References
"Forever" at Strawbsweb

1970 singles
Strawbs songs
1970 songs
Songs written by Dave Cousins
Songs written by Tony Hooper